The 1956–57 Segunda División season was the 26th since its establishment and was played between 8 September 1956 and 16 June 1957.

Overview before the season
40 teams joined the league, including 4 relegated from the 1955–56 La Liga and 11 promoted from the 1955–56 Tercera División.

Relegated from La Liga
Murcia
Alavés
Cultural Leonesa
Hércules

Promoted from Tercera División

Burgos
Gerona
Levante
Córdoba
Avilés
Rayo Vallecano
Alicante
Puente Genil
Eldense
Algeciras
Atlético Ceuta

Group North

Teams

League table

Results

Top goalscorers

Top goalkeepers

Group South

Teams

League table

Results

Top goalscorers

Top goalkeepers

Relegation playoffs

First leg

Second leg

External links
BDFútbol

Segunda División seasons
2
Spain